James Joseph Kelly (10 May 1867 – 14 August 1938) was a wicket-keeper who played for Australia and New South Wales.

He was Australia's first choice Test keeper from 1896 to 1905 and he was named a Wisden Cricketer of the Year in 1903. He toured England four times (1896, 1899, 1902 and 1905) and was also an able batsman, with a first-class average of 19.94 and a highest score of 108*. His career came to an end from medical advice, as he was struck above the heart while keeping during a test at Old Trafford in England.

References

External links

1867 births
1938 deaths
Australia Test cricketers
New South Wales cricketers
Wisden Cricketers of the Year
Australian cricketers
Cricketers from Melbourne
Wicket-keepers